Nathaniel Adams Burpee (March 13, 1816- December 11, 1887) was an American politician from Maine.

Biography 
Nathaniel Burpee was born on 13 March 1816 in Grafton, Massachusetts to Heman and Satira Burpee. He would go on to be the eldest of seven children.

In adulthood, Burpee founded a livery and blacksmith business with his younger brother Samuel. By 1830, their business had evolved to include undertaking and funeral services.

On 27 December 1838 he married Mary Jane Patridge, with whom he had five children.

A house painter from Rockland, Maine, Burpee served two single-year terms in the Maine House of Representatives (1854-1855) and four single-year terms in the Maine Senate (1858-1859; 1866-1867). During his final term, he was chosen to be President of the Maine Senate.

References

1816 births
1887 deaths
People from Grafton, Massachusetts
People from Rockland, Maine
Republican Party members of the Maine House of Representatives
Presidents of the Maine Senate
Republican Party Maine state senators
19th-century American politicians